Senator Leeper may refer to:

Arthur A. Leeper (1855–1931), Illinois State Senate
Bob Leeper (born 1958), Kentucky State Senate